Tropical Birdland in the north of the village of Desford, Leicestershire, England, is a visitor attraction that has many bird species including parrots, toucans, hornbills and owls on display. Some of the birds are allowed to fly out-of-doors during visiting hours.

External links
Tropical Birdland's website
Tropical Birdland (on Hinckley and Bosworth council website)
Tropical Birdland (on National Forest website)

Tourist attractions in Leicestershire
Zoos in England